The Adams–Williamson equation, named after Leason H. Adams and E. D. Williamson, is an equation used to determine density as a function of radius, more commonly used to determine the relation between the velocities of seismic waves and the density of the Earth's interior.  Given the average density of rocks at the Earth's surface and profiles of the P-wave and S-wave speeds as function of depth, it can predict how density increases with depth.  It assumes that the compression is adiabatic and that the Earth is spherically symmetric, homogeneous, and in hydrostatic equilibrium. It can also be applied to spherical shells with that property. It is an important part of models of the Earth's interior such as the Preliminary reference Earth model (PREM).

History 

Williamson and Adams first developed the theory in 1923. They concluded that "It is therefore impossible to explain the high density of the Earth on the basis of compression alone. The dense interior cannot consist of ordinary rocks compressed to a small volume; we must therefore fall back on the only reasonable alternative, namely, the presence of a heavier material, presumably some metal, which, to judge from its abundance in the Earth's crust, in meteorites and in the Sun, is probably iron."

Theory 

The two types of seismic body waves are compressional waves (P-waves) and shear waves (S-waves). Both have speeds that are determined by the elastic properties of the medium they travel through, in particular the bulk modulus K, the shear modulus μ, and the density ρ. In terms of these parameters, the P-wave speed vp and the S-wave speed vs are

These two speeds can be combined in a seismic parameter

The definition of the bulk modulus,

is equivalent to

Suppose a region at a distance r from the Earth's center can be considered a fluid in hydrostatic equilibrium, it is acted on by gravitational attraction from the part of the Earth that is below it and pressure from the part above it. Also suppose that the compression is adiabatic (so thermal expansion does not contribute to density variations). The pressure P(r) varies with r as

where g(r) is the gravitational acceleration at radius r.

This equation can be integrated to obtain

where r0 is the radius at the Earth's surface and ρ0 is the density at the surface. Given ρ0 and profiles of the P- and S-wave speeds, the radial dependence of the density can be determined by numerical integration.

References 

Structure of the Earth
Geophysics
Ordinary differential equations